Der Eigene  was one of the first gay journals in the world, published from 1896 to 1932 by Adolf Brand in Berlin. Brand contributed many poems and articles; other contributors included writers Benedict Friedlaender, Hanns Heinz Ewers, Erich Mühsam, Kurt Hiller, Ernst Burchard, John Henry Mackay, Theodor Lessing, Klaus Mann, and Thomas Mann, as well as artists Wilhelm von Gloeden, Fidus, and Sascha Schneider.  The journal may have had an average of around 1500 subscribers per issue during its run, but the exact numbers are uncertain.


History of the journal
The title of the journal, Der Eigene (The Unique), refers to the classic anarchist work Der Einzige und sein Eigentum (1844) by Max Stirner.  Early issues reflected the philosophy of Stirner, as well as other views on the politics of anarchism. In the 1920s the journal shifted to support the liberal democracy of the Weimar Republic and more specifically the Social Democratic Party. Der Eigene interwove cultural, artistic, and political material, including lyric poetry, prose, political manifesto and nude photography.

The publisher of Der Eigene had to fight against government censorship. For example, in 1903 a published poem "Die Freundschaft" (Friendship) provoked a lawsuit against the magazine. The magazine won because the poem was written by Friedrich Schiller.

In 1933, when Adolf Hitler rose to power, Adolf Brand's house was searched and all the materials needed to produce the magazine were seized and given to Ernst Röhm.

In a major effort in 2020, Humboldt University of Berlin made available the complete set of the magazine on its website, with censorship in form of pixellation applied to several pages containing artistic photographs and paintings.

Gallery

See also
Magnus Hirschfeld

References

Further reading 
 Reprint: Der Eigene. Ein Blatt für männliche Kultur. Ein Querschnitt durch die erste Homosexuellenzeitschrift der Welt. With an article by Friedrich Kröhnke. Published and afterwords by Joachim S. Hohmann, Foerster Verlag, Frankfurt/Main and Berlin 1981.

External links 

 Homodok.nl Full text scan (pdf) 1896-1900 and 1903 at IHLIA LGBT Heritage.
 Schillers "Die Freundschaft" 
 Part of a letter by Brand from 1933 about the end of the magazine . ?
 Complete set digitized on Humboldt University website (some pages with photographs and artworks partially censored)

1890s in LGBT history
1896 establishments in Germany
1932 disestablishments in Germany
Anarchism and free love
Anarchist periodicals published in Germany
Defunct political magazines published in Germany
Egoist anarchism
Gay history
Gay men's magazines
LGBT-related magazines published in Germany
German-language magazines
Individualist anarchism
LGBT anarchism
First homosexual movement
Magazines established in 1896
Magazines disestablished in 1932
Magazines published in Berlin